The following is a list of astronomical instrument makers, along with lifespan and country of work, if available.

A

B

C

D

E

F

G

H

I

J

K

L

M

N

O

P

Q

R

S

T

U

V

W

X

Y

Z

See also
 History of the telescope
 List of largest optical reflecting telescopes
 List of largest optical refracting telescopes
 List of observatory codes
 List of Russian astronomers and astrophysicists
 List of telescope types
 Space telescope
 Timeline of telescopes, observatories, and observing technology

External links

Technology-related lists
Instrument makers
Lists of manufacturers
Astronomical instruments